"Words Get in the Way" is a song written by Gloria Estefan and released as the third single from her band, Miami Sound Machine, on their second English language album, and ninth overall, Primitive Love. The song is a ballad and became the highest-charting song off the album.

Song history 
As a ballad, "Words Get in the Way" marked a change in sound from the band's earlier singles and foreshadowed Estefan's later success.

The song was their first to crack the Top 5 on the U.S. Billboard Hot 100, peaking at #5, and became their first number-one hit on Billboards Adult Contemporary chart in 1986. They didn't achieve the same success internationally, but still managed to reach the Top 20 in other countries. The single was certified Gold by the ARIA for its sales of 35,000 copies.

The band re-recorded the song in Spanish under the title "No Me Vuelvo a Enamorar" ("I Won't Fall in Love Again"), although not a direct translation. The Spanish version entered the "Hot Latin Songs" in the Top 20, becoming the band's first entrance on the chart. This version was available on international pressings of the album and on its inclusion on Estefan's Spanish compilation Exitos de Gloria Estefan.

A live version with a different arrangement was included as a B-side to the single, "Always Tomorrow," and as a bonus track on international editions of Into the Light.  It was taken from Estefan's Homecoming Concert in Miami from her 1988 Let it Loose Tour, released on VHS.

The song was featured in 1986 episodes of the daytime soap operas All My Children and Another World.

Formats and track listings

 Official versions Original versions'
 Album Version — (3:23)
 Spanish Version ("No Me Vuelvo a Enamorar") — (3:23)
 Live Version (from the Homecoming Concert in Miami 1988) — (5:02)

Release history

Chart performance

Weekly charts

Year-end charts

References

External links 
 gloriestefanmyspace
 gloriestefanmexico.com
 90millas.com
  gloriaestefandiscographydatabase

Miami Sound Machine songs
Gloria Estefan songs
1986 singles
Songs written by Gloria Estefan
Pop ballads
1985 songs
Epic Records singles
Song recordings produced by Emilio Estefan